Myall Park is a rural locality in the Western Downs Region, Queensland, Australia.

Road infrastructure
The Leichhardt Highway runs along the north-western boundary.

References 

Western Downs Region
Localities in Queensland